Dayton is both a surname and a given name. Notable people with the name include:

Surname
Alan Dayton, Acting Mayor of Salt Lake County
Alston G. Dayton (1857–1920), West Virginia congressman
Danny Dayton (1923–1999), American actor
Douglas Dayton (1924–2013), American businessman and philanthropist
Elias Dayton (1737–1807), Colonel and father of Jonathan and builder of Fort Dayton
George Dayton (1857–1938), American entrepreneur and founder of Dayton's department store
Howard Dayton (born 1943), American chief executives
James Dayton (born 1988), English footballer
Jesse Dayton, American musician
Jesse C. Dayton (born 1825), New York politician
John C. Dayton (1837–1899), Mayor of Flint, Michigan
Jonathan Dayton (1760–1824), son of Elias, signer of the United States Constitution, and Speaker of the House
Keith Dayton (born 1949), US Army Lieutenant General
Margaret Dayton (born 1949), American politician
Mark Dayton (born 1947), former Governor of Minnesota and former US Senator
Matt Dayton (born 1977), American Nordic combined skier
Sky Dayton (born 1971), American entrepreneur
Warren Dayton (born 1940), American illustrator
William L. Dayton (1807–1864), American politician

Given name
Dayton Allen (1919–2004), comedian and voice actor
Dayton Countryman (1918-2011), American politician
Dayton Miller (1866–1941), American physicist and astronomer
Dayton Ward (born 1967), science fiction author

See also

Danton (name)